John Hales Montagu Calcraft (4 May 1831 – 1 December 1868) was a British Liberal Party politician.

Calcraft was the son of former Wareham MP John Hales Calcraft and Lady Caroline Katherine Montagu, daughter of William Montagu, 5th Duke of Manchester. His brother Henry George Calcraft was permanent secretary to the Board of Trade.

Calcraft followed in the footsteps of his father and his grandfather, John Calcraft, when he was elected MP for Wareham at the 1865 general election, and was re-elected at the 1868 election, yet shortly after died.

References

External links
 

Liberal Party (UK) MPs for English constituencies
UK MPs 1865–1868
UK MPs 1868–1874
1831 births
1868 deaths